The WGC Championship was a professional golf tournament that was held between 1999 and 2021. It was one of the three or four annual World Golf Championships until the number of WGC events was reduced to two following the 2021 season.
 
Under sponsorship agreements, the WGC Championship was titled as the WGC-American Express Championship (1999–2006), when it was hosted at various locations in Europe and the United States; the WGC-CA Championship (2007–2010), then the WGC-Cadillac Championship (2011–2016), when it was hosted at Doral Golf Resort, Florida; and the WGC-Mexico Championship (2017–2020), when it was played at Club de Golf Chapultepec in Mexico. In 2021, the tournament was disrupted by travel restrictions due to the COVID-19 pandemic; it was relocated to The Concession Golf Club in Florida and titled as the WGC-Workday Championship.

It was sanctioned and organized by the International Federation of PGA Tours and the prize money was official money on both the PGA Tour and the European Tour. Tiger Woods had the record number of wins with seven. The winner received a Wedgwood trophy named the Gene Sarazen Cup.

History

WGC-American Express Championship (1999–2006) 
Founded in 1999, the first two events were held in November at the Valderrama Golf Club in Southern Spain. The third event was due to be held in Missouri, but was cancelled following the September 11 attacks in New York. The remaining five events were held in late September / early October, twice in Ireland and the United States, and once in England. The event was dominated by Tiger Woods who won five of the first seven editions.

Hosting at Doral Golf Resort, Florida (2007–2016) 
In 2007 the PGA Tour introduced the FedEx Cup, and moved the Tour Championship forward to mid September. As the event was historically held after this date it would have meant that it would not have formed part of the PGA Tour regular season unless it was moved. The event was reinvented with a new sponsor (CA, Inc, and later Cadillac), a new hosting month (March), and a new permanent host (Doral, Florida). The decision to host on the Blue Monster course at Doral Golf Resort brought to an end the Ford Championship at Doral, a regular stop on the PGA Tour in March for 45 consecutive years (1962–2006). However, due to the WGC records taking precedence over PGA Tour records, technically the Cadillac Championship succeeded the American Express event, not the Ford Championship. With the WGC-World Cup losing its World Golf Championship status after the 2006 event, it meant all three remaining WGC events were permanently held in the United States which drew criticism from some players and commentators.

WGC-Mexico Championship (2017–2020) 
After Cadillac decided not to renew sponsorship of the event, it moved to Club de Golf Chapultepec in Naucalpan, just northwest of Mexico City in 2017. Grupo Salinas took up sponsorship, although their name does not appear in the title of the tournament. Donald Trump had purchased and renamed Trump National Doral in 2012, and many saw the move as being driven by sponsors and the PGA Tour wanting to distance themselves from controversy. It was also an opportunity to counter criticism that not enough World Golf Championship events were held outside the United States. The Club de Golf Chapultepec is a tree-lined parkland course with tight fairways and undulating terrain, built approximately 1.36 miles (more than 7,800 feet) above sea level, which results in much longer ball flights than other golf events. In 2017 and 2018 it continued to be held in March, which meant it interrupted the PGA Tour's "Florida Swing", but in 2019 it was moved to February to follow events on the West Coast and precede the tournaments in Florida. The 2019 event was sold out due to being Tiger Woods' first professional appearance in Mexico.

WGC-Workday Championship (2021)
The 2021 event was originally scheduled to take place again in Mexico, but due to the COVID-19 pandemic, the event was moved to Florida in January 2021. On February 16, it was announced Workday, Inc. would become the new title sponsor. Collin Morikawa won the 2021 event by three strokes ahead of Billy Horschel, Viktor Hovland and Brooks Koepka.

In August 2021, the PGA Tour released its schedule for the 2021–22 season. It was confirmed that the Mexico Championship (WGC Championship) and the FedEx St. Jude Invitational (WGC Invitational) would no longer be part of the World Golf Championships.

Structure

Field 
The tournament consisted of a field of 72 players filled based upon the following criteria:

Top 50 players from the Official World Golf Ranking (one week and two weeks prior to event)
 Top players from member tours' money lists or orders of merit (from last complete season)
 Top 30 PGA Tour FedEx Cup list (also top 10 from one week prior to event)
 Top 20 European Tour (also top 10 from two weeks prior to event)
 Top 2 each from Asian Tour, Japan Golf Tour, PGA Tour of Australasia, and Sunshine Tour 
 The highest ranked available player from Mexico in the Official World Golf Ranking (two weeks prior to event)
 Alternates to fill field to 72 (if necessary) from the Official World Golf Ranking (one week prior to event)

Format 
The tournament was a 72-hole stroke play event with no cut. If there was a tie after 72 holes, there was a sudden death playoff to decide a winner. Only three playoffs occurred in the tournament's history; in 1999, 2005 and 2018; Tiger Woods being involved in two of them.

Winners

Note: Green highlight indicates scoring records.
Source:

See also
Winners of the Doral Open (1962–2006), also played at Doral Golf Resort & Spa's Blue Monster Course

Notes

References

External links

Coverage on the European Tour's official site

 
World Golf Championships
Former PGA Tour events
Former European Tour events
Golf tournaments in Mexico
Golf in Florida
Sports competitions in Miami
Recurring sporting events established in 1999
Spring (season) events in Mexico